Varnashilpi Venkatappa Award is an award conferred annually by the Government of Karnataka for excellence in painting.

Civil awards and decorations of Karnataka
Indian art awards
Indian painting
Year of establishment missing